Rafael Alberto "Al" Reyes (born April 10, 1970) is a former Major League Baseball pitcher. A right-handed pitcher and career reliever, he played for seven teams; debuting on April 27, 1995, with the Milwaukee Brewers and playing for the Baltimore Orioles, Los Angeles Dodgers, Pittsburgh Pirates, New York Yankees, St. Louis Cardinals, and Tampa Bay Devil Rays/Rays, over the years.

Career
He was 2–0 with a 4.25 earned run average (ERA) and a .206 opponents batting average in 26 games with the Brewers in 1999 until he was sent to the Orioles on July 21 of that year to complete a transaction from five days prior on July 16 when Rocky Coppinger was sent to Milwaukee.

He missed the Cardinals  playoff run after tearing a ligament in his right elbow, and required reconstructive surgery.

In , he signed with the Tampa Bay Devil Rays and was placed on the Durham Bulls minor league roster, but did not play a game that season while recovering from Tommy John surgery. On December 22, 2006, he re-signed with the Tampa Bay Devil Rays, where he became their closer. Reyes finished the  year with 26 saves in 30 chances. Notably, his only blown saves came against the Arizona Diamondbacks and the Boston Red Sox.

On April 10, 2008, Reyes got into a fight at a bar in South Tampa and was tasered twice by a police officer.  This had little effect on his ability to throw, as the very next night he got the win for the Rays against the Orioles.

Reyes was designated for assignment on August 9, 2008, and became a free agent on August 18 after refusing an assignment to the minors. He signed a minor league contract with the New York Mets two days later, and was called up to the team when rosters expanded in September.  He was released on September 18, 2008, without making any appearances.

References

External links

1970 births
Living people
Albany Polecats players
Albuquerque Dukes players
Baltimore Orioles players
Beloit Snappers players
Binghamton Mets players
Burlington Bees players
Columbus Clippers players
Dominican Republic expatriate baseball players in Mexico
Dominican Republic expatriate baseball players in the United States
Durham Bulls players
Harrisburg Senators players
Las Vegas 51s players

Los Angeles Dodgers players
Louisville Redbirds players
Louisville RiverBats players
Major League Baseball pitchers
Major League Baseball players from the Dominican Republic
Memphis Redbirds players
Mexican League baseball pitchers
Milwaukee Brewers players
Nashville Sounds players
New York Yankees players
Petroleros de Minatitlán players
Pittsburgh Pirates players
Rio Grande Valley WhiteWings players
Rochester Red Wings players
Rockford Expos players
St. Louis Cardinals players
Tampa Bay Devil Rays players
Tampa Bay Rays players
Tucson Toros players
Vero Beach Devil Rays players
West Palm Beach Expos players